The Detection Club was formed in 1930 by a group of British mystery writers, including Agatha Christie, Dorothy L. Sayers, Ronald Knox, Freeman Wills Crofts, Arthur Morrison, Hugh Walpole, John Rhode, Jessie Rickard, Baroness Emma Orczy, R. Austin Freeman, G. D. H. Cole, Margaret Cole, E. C. Bentley, Henry Wade, Constance Lindsay Taylor and H. C. Bailey. Anthony Berkeley was instrumental in setting up the club, and the first president was G. K. Chesterton. There was a fanciful initiation ritual with an oath written by Sayers, and the club held regular dinner meetings in London.

Guidelines
In addition to meeting for dinners and helping each other with technical aspects in their individual writings, the members of the club agreed to adhere to Knox's Commandments in their writing to give the reader a fair chance at guessing the guilty party. These fair-play "rules" were summarised by one of the members, Ronald Knox, in an introduction to an anthology of detective stories. They were never intended as more than guidelines, and not all the members took them seriously. The first American member (though then living in the UK) was John Dickson Carr, elected in 1936.

The club continues to exist, although the fair-play rules have been considerably relaxed.

A number of works were published under the club's sponsorship; most of these were written by multiple members of the club, each contributing one or more chapters in turn. In the case of The Floating Admiral, each author also provided a sealed "solution" to the mystery as he or she had written it, including the previous chapters. This was done to prevent a writer from adding impossible complications with no reasonable solution in mind. The various partial solutions were published as part of the final book.

The oath 
Do you promise that your detectives shall well and truly detect the crimes presented to them using those wits which it may please you to bestow upon them and not placing reliance on nor making use of Divine Revelation, Feminine Intuition, Mumbo Jumbo, Jiggery-Pokery, Coincidence, or Act of God?

Presidents 
G. K. Chesterton (1930–1936)
E. C. Bentley (1936–1949)
Dorothy L. Sayers (1949–1957)
Agatha Christie (1957–1976)
Lord Gorell (1957–1963)
Julian Symons (1976–1985)
H. R. F. Keating (1985–2000)
Simon Brett (2000–2015)
Martin Edwards (2015–)

Lord Gorell shared the presidency with Agatha Christie, who only agreed to accept the role if a co-president was appointed to conduct the club's proceedings.

Publications 
The Scoop and Behind the Screen (1931, round-robin novellas)
The Floating Admiral (1931,1932, round-robin novel)
Ask a Policeman (1933)
The Anatomy of a Murder (1936) (US title The Anatomy of Murder (New York, Macmillan, 1937) True crime essays
Detection Medley (1939; US title, Line-Up, 1940; short stories, some original, some reprints; edited by John Rhode)
Mystery Playhouse presents The Detection Club (January 1948); six 30 minute radio plays by club members on BBC Light Programme written in aid of club funds 
No Flowers By Request (round-robin novella, 1953)
Verdict of Thirteen (1978; original short stories, edited by Julian Symons, published by Faber and by Harper & Row)
The Man Who... (1992); original short stories in honor of Julian Symons's 80th birthday, edited by H. R. F. Keating, published by Macmillan])
The Detection Collection (2005; original short stories in recognition of the Club's 75th anniversary, edited by Simon Brett, published by Orion and by St. Martin;'s (2006))
The Verdict of Us All (2006; original short stories in honor of H. R. F. Keating's 80th birthday, edited by Peter Lovesey, published by Crippen & Landru and Allison & Busby)
The Sinking Admiral (2016, round-robin novel, published by Collins Crime Club)
 Motives for Murder (2016; original short stories in honor of Peter Lovesey's 80th birthday, edited by Martin Edwards, published by Crippen & Landru and by Sphere (Little, Brown Book Group).
 Howdunit: A Masterclass in Crime Writing by Members of the Detection Club (2020; edited by Martin Edwards, published by Collins Crime Club).
 Eric the Skull (2020; a 45-minute BBC Radio 4 play, being a fictionalised account of the setting up of the club, written by Simon Brett and produced by Liz Anstee).

References

Further reading
 Edwards, Martin. The Golden Age of Murder: The Mystery of the Writers Who Invented the Modern Detective Story. London: HarperCollins, 2015.

External links
 Detection Club: list of publications
 Detection Club admission ceremony and oath
 List of members

Detective fiction
 
Clubs and societies in London
Organizations established in 1930
1930 establishments in the United Kingdom

it:AA.VV.